Marsupiomonas is a genus of green algae in the family Marsupiomonadaceae.

References

External links

Chlorophyta genera
Pedinophyceae